Kenneth Ikugar (born 27 October 2000) is a Nigerian professional footballer who plays as a striker for Slovak club FC ViOn Zlaté Moravce, on loan from FC Spartak Trnava.

Club career

FC ViOn Zlaté Moravce
Ikugar made his professional Fortuna Liga debut for FC ViOn Zlaté Moravce against FK Železiarne Podbrezová on 11 February 2023.

References

External links
 
 
 Futbalnet Profile 

2000 births
Living people
People from Calabar
Nigerian footballers
Nigerian expatriate footballers
Association football forwards
FK Ústí nad Labem players
FC Spartak Trnava players
FK Slavoj Trebišov players
FC ViOn Zlaté Moravce players
Czech National Football League players
Slovak Super Liga players
Expatriate footballers in the Czech Republic
Nigerian expatriate sportspeople in the Czech Republic
Expatriate footballers in Slovakia
Nigerian expatriate sportspeople in Slovakia